Diabetic dermadromes constitute a group of cutaneous conditions commonly seen in people with diabetes with longstanding disease.  Conditions included in this group are:

 Acral dry gangrene
 Carotenosis
 Diabetic dermopathy
 Diabetic bulla
 Diabetic cheiroarthropathy
 Malum perforans
 Necrobiosis lipoidica
 Limited joint mobility is observed in roughly 30% of people with diabetes with longstanding disease.
 Scleredema
 Waxy skin is observed in roughly 50%.

See also 
 List of cutaneous conditions

References 

Skin conditions resulting from errors in metabolism